Odostomia corimbensis is a species of sea snail, a marine gastropod mollusc in the family Pyramidellidae, the pyrams and their allies.

This species is considered a synonym of Odostomia (Megastomia) conoidea conoidea (Brocchi, G.B., 1814)

References

External links
 To World Register of Marine Species

corimbensis
Gastropods described in 1994